Rachan Prasitthong (ราชัน ประสิทธิทอง, born March 7, 1999) is a Thai professional footballer who currently plays for Krabi in the Thai League 2.

References

External links
 

1999 births
Living people
Rachan Prasitthong
Rachan Prasitthong
Thai expatriate footballers
Association football midfielders
Rachan Prasitthong
Rachan Prasitthong
Rachan Prasitthong
Rachan Prasitthong
Rachan Prasitthong
Rachan Prasitthong
Thai expatriate sportspeople in England